Veigaia nemorensis is a species of mite in the family Veigaiidae. It is found in Europe.

References

Mesostigmata
Articles created by Qbugbot
Animals described in 1839